Carry the Fire is the debut studio album by American folk rock band Delta Rae. It was released in 2012 on Sire Records.

Critical reception
PopMatters wrote that "Delta Rae needs better material to show off what makes them special and distinctive." Indy Week called the album "an embarrassment of expectations and enthusiasms, where musical and lyrical platitudes dovetail for 48 overwrought and unrelenting minutes."

Track listing

Personnel
Elizabeth Hopkins – lead vocals
Brittany Hölljes – lead vocals
Ian Hölljes – guitar, vocals
Eric Hölljes – keyboards, piano, guitar, vocals
Mike McKee – drums, percussion
Grant Emerson – bass guitar

References

2012 debut albums
Delta Rae albums
Sire Records albums
Warner Records albums